The following list of Carnegie libraries in Iowa provides detailed information on United States Carnegie libraries in Iowa, where 101 public libraries were built from 99 grants (totaling $1,495,706) awarded by the Carnegie Corporation of New York from 1892 to 1917. In addition, academic libraries were built at 7 institutions (totaling $210,000).

Key

Public libraries

Academic libraries

Notes

References

 
 
 
 
Note: The above references, while all authoritative, are not entirely mutually consistent. Some details of this list may have been drawn from one of the references (usually Jones) without support from the others. Reader discretion is advised.

Iowa

Libraries
Libraries